Diosig is a commune in Bihor County, Crișana, Romania with a population of 6,816 people. It is composed of two villages, Diosig and Ianca (Jankafalva).

The commune is located in the northwestern part of the county, on the banks of the river Ier. It is crossed by national road , which runs from Oradea to the cities of Carei, Satu Mare, and Sighetu Marmației to the northeast. 

At the 2002 census, 56.5% of inhabitants were Hungarians, 32.6% Romanians and 10.7% Roma. 53.4% were Reformed, 27.7% Romanian Orthodox, 8.2% Roman Catholic, 4.9% Pentecostal, 2.2% Seventh-Day Adventist and 1.5% Baptist.

See also
Skirmish at Diosig

References

Diosig
Localities in Crișana
Hungarian communities in Romania